Armata may refer to:

 Armata, Greece, a settlement in the municipality Konitsa, northern Greece
 Armata Corsa, an underground separatist terrorist organization in Corsica, today disbanded
 Armata Universal Combat Platform, a Russian platform for future heavy infantry fighting vehicle, main battle tank, and other heavy military machines.
 T-14 Armata, the main battle tank based on the above platform

See also 
 Armada (disambiguation)